Athletics competitions at the 2009 ALBA Games were held at the Estadio Panamericano in La Habana, Cuba, between April 23-25, 2009.

A total of 44 events were contested, 22 by men and 22 by women.

Medal summary
Medal winners and their results were published.  Complete results can be found on the FEDACHI webpage.

Men

Women

Medal table (unofficial)

Participation (unofficial)
An unofficial count yields the participation of athletes from the following 9 countries:

 

 
 
 
 
 
 México

Cuban athletes were distributed over different teams Cuba, Cuba B, Cuba C, and Cuba D.
In addition, there were a number of athletes competing as EIEFD.  Some of them
were tentatively assigned to the following countries (incomplete):

 

 
 Panamá

References

Athletics at the ALBA Games
International athletics competitions hosted by Cuba
ALBA Games
2009 in Cuban sport